Ivan Rusev (born 10 May 1979) is a Bulgarian former football player who played as a midfielder and manager. His nickname is "The Little Jangur" due to his father's nickname.

Club career
Rusev started his football career in 1990 at Chernomorets Burgas where he after brief spells at Litex Lovech in 1996 and 2000, he joined Spartak Varna, while in 1996 he was named the best young footballer in of the year. He maved to Greece in 2000 where he was loaned to Egaleo and stood out for 6 months, as a result of which he was transferred to AEK Athens in 2001. In his first season he was loaned to Athinaikos and then loaned again to Apollon Athens. He returned to AEK in 2003 and played with the club until 2005. He started in both matches against Eindhoven for the group stage of the UEFA Champions League. In 2005 joined Levadiakos for three years and then Diagoras for another two, where he was successful. He then had brief spells at Trikala, OFI, Pierikos, Doxa Drama, while from 2013 to December 2014 he played at Panelefsiniakos. After a brief spell at AE Peramatos in 2015 he played at Agioi Anargiroi in the local divisions of Athens. He retired in 2019 at Diana Ilioupolis. 

==Managerial career
In 2018 he started his career as a coach. He started in youth football at his last club, where he played - Iliopouli. Rusev leads the U17 teams and coaches boys under 13. Both his teams play in the Athens Championship. Heute arbeitet Rusev am Willigis-Gymnasium in Mainz als Kunstlehrer .

Personal life
Rusev is the son of PFC Nesebar legend, Nikolai  who was nicknamed "The Jangur".

References

1979 births
Living people
Bulgarian footballers
FC Chernomorets Burgas players
PFC Litex Lovech players
PFC Spartak Varna players
AEK Athens F.C. players
Levadiakos F.C. players
Apollon Smyrnis F.C. players
Athinaikos F.C. players
Egaleo F.C. players
OFI Crete F.C. players
First Professional Football League (Bulgaria) players
Bulgaria youth international footballers
Super League Greece players
Bulgarian expatriate footballers
Expatriate footballers in Greece
Bulgarian expatriate sportspeople in Greece
Association football midfielders